Qızıloba may refer to:
Qızıloba, Khojali, Azerbaijan
Qızıloba, Tartar, Azerbaijan